Tikokino is a town in the Central Hawke's Bay District on the east coast of the North Island of New Zealand. The township is located on State Highway 50.

The township was founded by the Government in 1860. Hampden, as it was originally called, began as sawmilling centre for local forests, becoming a service town for the farms which took their place. By the early 2000s, most residents were working at a nearby meat processing plant, dairy farming, or for local growers.

Tikokino has eight buildings registered by Heritage New Zealand, including the Gwavas Station Homestead and Garden as Category I.

Demographics
It is part of the larger Mangaonuku statistical area.

Tikokino had a population of 192 at the 2018 New Zealand census, an increase of 27 people (16.4%) since the 2013 census, and an increase of 45 people (30.6%) since the 2006 census. There were 75 households, comprising 93 males and 93 females, giving a sex ratio of 1.0 males per female. The median age was 45.3 years (compared with 37.4 years nationally), with 36 people (18.8%) aged under 15 years, 18 (9.4%) aged 15 to 29, 105 (54.7%) aged 30 to 64, and 27 (14.1%) aged 65 or older.

Ethnicities were 93.8% European/Pākehā, 10.9% Māori, and 3.1% other ethnicities. People may identify with more than one ethnicity.

Although some people chose not to answer the census's question about religious affiliation, 57.8% had no religion, 31.2% were Christian, 1.6% had Māori religious beliefs and 3.1% had other religions.

Of those at least 15 years old, 30 (19.2%) people had a bachelor's or higher degree, and 33 (21.2%) people had no formal qualifications. The median income was $27,800, compared with $31,800 nationally. 21 people (13.5%) earned over $70,000 compared to 17.2% nationally. The employment status of those at least 15 was that 81 (51.9%) people were employed full-time, 21 (13.5%) were part-time, and 3 (1.9%) were unemployed.

Mangaonuku statistical area

Mangaonuku had a population of 948 at the 2018 New Zealand census, an increase of 114 people (13.7%) since the 2013 census, and an increase of 84 people (9.7%) since the 2006 census. There were 336 households, comprising 516 males and 432 females, giving a sex ratio of 1.19 males per female. The median age was 40.4 years (compared with 37.4 years nationally), with 198 people (20.9%) aged under 15 years, 138 (14.6%) aged 15 to 29, 501 (52.8%) aged 30 to 64, and 108 (11.4%) aged 65 or older.

Ethnicities were 87.3% European/Pākehā, 17.4% Māori, 3.2% Pacific peoples, 0.9% Asian, and 1.6% other ethnicities. People may identify with more than one ethnicity.

The percentage of people born overseas was 13.0, compared with 27.1% nationally.

Although some people chose not to answer the census's question about religious affiliation, 52.5% had no religion, 35.4% were Christian, 2.2% had Māori religious beliefs and 1.6% had other religions.

Of those at least 15 years old, 117 (15.6%) people had a bachelor's or higher degree, and 135 (18.0%) people had no formal qualifications. The median income was $32,500, compared with $31,800 nationally. 90 people (12.0%) earned over $70,000 compared to 17.2% nationally. The employment status of those at least 15 was that 441 (58.8%) people were employed full-time, 120 (16.0%) were part-time, and 15 (2.0%) were unemployed.

Marae

The local Rakautātahi Marae is a tribal meeting ground for local Māori, with a meeting house called Te Poho o Te Whatuiapiti. The marae is affiliated with the Ngāti Kahungunu hapū of Ngāi Toroiwaho, Ngāi Te Kikiri o Te Rangi, Ngāi Toroiwaho, Rangi Te Kahutia and Rangitotohu, and with the Rangitāne hapū of Ngāi Tahu and Ngāti Rangitotohu.

In October 2020, the Government committed $887,291 from the Provincial Growth Fund to upgrade the marae and 4 others, creating 12 jobs.

Education
Tikokino School is a Year 1–8 co-educational state primary school.

Notable people
 

Alice May Parkinson (1889–1949), New Zealand murderer

References

Central Hawke's Bay District
Populated places in the Hawke's Bay Region